The Galápagos Islands (Spanish: ,) are an archipelago of volcanic islands. They are distributed on each side of the equator in the Pacific Ocean, surrounding the centre of the Western Hemisphere, and are part of the Republic of Ecuador. His observations and collections contributed to the inception of Darwin's theory of evolution by means of natural selection.

The Galápagos Islands and their surrounding waters form the Galápagos Province of Ecuador, the Galápagos National Park, and the Galápagos Marine Reserve. The principal language on the islands is Spanish. The islands have a population of slightly over 25,000.

The first recorded visit to the islands happened by chance in 1535, when Fray Tomás de Berlanga, the Bishop of Panamá, was surprised to find this undiscovered land on a voyage to Peru to arbitrate in a dispute between Francisco Pizarro and Diego de Almagro. Berlanga eventually returned to the Spanish Empire and described the conditions of the islands and the animals that inhabited them. The group of islands was shown and named "Insulae de los Galopegos" (Islands of the tortoises) in Abraham Ortelius's map "America Sive Novi Orbis" published in 1570.  The first crude map of the islands was made in 1684 by the buccaneer Ambrose Cowley, who named the individual islands after some of his fellow pirates or after English royalty and noblemen. These names were used in the authoritative navigation charts of the islands prepared during the Beagle survey under captain Robert FitzRoy, and in Darwin's popular book The Voyage of the Beagle. The newly independent Republic of Ecuador took the islands from Spanish ownership in 1832, and subsequently gave them new Spanish names. The older names remained in use in English-language publications, including Herman Melville's The Encantadas of 1854.
Administratively, Galapagos constitutes one of the provinces of Ecuador, made up of three cantons that bear the names of its most populated islands, namely: San Cristóbal, Santa Cruz and Isabela.

Geology

Volcanism has been continuous on the Galápagos Islands for at least 20 million years, and perhaps even longer. The mantle plume beneath the east-ward moving Nazca Plate (51 km/myr) has given rise to a 3-kilometre-thick platform under the island chain and seamounts. Besides the Galápagos Archipelago, other key tectonic features in the region include the Northern Galápagos Volcanic Province between the archipelago and the Galápagos Spreading Center (GSC) 200 km to the north at the boundary of the Nazca Plate and the Cocos Plate. This spreading center truncates into the East Pacific Rise on the west and is bounded by the Cocos Ridge and Carnegie Ridge in the east. Furthermore, the Galápagos Hotspot is at the northern boundary of the Pacific Large Low Shear Velocity Province while the Easter Hotspot is on the southern boundary.

The Galápagos Archipelago is characterized by numerous contemporaneous volcanoes, some with plume magma sources, others from the asthenosphere, possibly due to the young and thin oceanic crust. The GSC caused structural weaknesses in this thin lithosphere leading to eruptions forming the Galápagos Platform. Fernandina and Isabela in particular are aligned along these weaknesses. Lacking a well-defined rift zone, the islands have a high rate of inflation prior to eruption. Sierra Negra on Isabela Island experienced a 240 cm uplift between 1992 and 1998, most recent eruption in 2005, while Fernandina on Fernandina Island indicated an uplift of 90 cm, most recent eruption in 2009. Alcedo on Isabela Island had an uplift of greater than 90 cm, most recent eruption in 1993. Additional characteristics of the Galápagos Archipelago are closer volcano spacing, smaller volcano sizes, and larger calderas. For instance, Isabela Island includes 6 major volcanoes, Ecuador, Wolf, Darwin, Alcedo, Sierra Negraa and Cerro Azul, with most recent eruptions ranging from 1813 to 2008. The neighboring islands of Santiago and Fernandina last erupted in 1906 and 2009, respectively. Overall, the 9 active volcanoes in the archipelago have erupted 24 times between 1961 and 2011. The shape of these volcanoes is tall and rounded as opposed wide and smooth in the Hawaiian Islands. The Galápagos's shape is due to the pattern of radial and circumferential fissure, radial on the flanks, but circumferential near the caldera summits. It is the circumferential fissures which give rise to stacks of short lava flows.

The volcanoes at the west end of the archipelago are in general, taller, younger, have well developed calderas, and are mostly composed of tholeiitic basalt, while those on the east are shorter, older, lack calderas, and have a more diverse composition. The ages of the islands, from west to east are 0.05 Ma for Fernandina, 0.65 Ma for Isabela, 1.10 Ma for Santiago, 1.7 Ma for Santa Cruz, 2.90 Ma for Santa Fe, and 3.2 Ma for San Cristobal. The calderas on Sierra Negra and Alcedo have active fault systems. The Sierra Negra fault is associated with a sill 2 km below the caldera. The caldera on Fernandina experienced the largest basaltic volcano collapse in history, with the 1968 phreatomagmatic eruption. Fernandina has also been the most active volcano since 1790, with recent eruptions in 1991, 1995, 2005, and 2009, and the entire surface has been covered in numerous flows since 4.3 Ka. The western volcanoes have numerous tuff cones.

Physical geography
The majority of islands are also more broadly part of the South Pacific. The closest land mass is that of mainland Ecuador, the country to which they belong,  to the east.

The islands are found at the coordinates 1°40'N–1°36'S, 89°16'–92°01'W. Straddling the equator, islands in the chain are located in both the northern and southern hemispheres, with Volcán Wolf and Volcán Ecuador on Isla Isabela being directly on the equator. The International Hydrographic Organization (IHO) considers them wholly within the South Pacific Ocean, however. The largest of the islands, Isabela, measures  and makes up close to three-quarters of the total land area of the Galápagos.

The group consists of 18 main islands, 3 smaller islands, and 107 rocks and islets. The islands are located at the Galapagos Triple Junction. It is also atop the Galápagos hotspot, a place where the Earth's crust is being melted from below by a mantle plume, creating volcanoes. The first islands formed here at least 8 million and possibly up to 90 million years ago.

While the older islands have disappeared below the sea as they moved away from the mantle plume, the youngest islands, Isabela and Fernandina, are still being formed. In April 2009, lava from the volcanic island Fernandina started flowing both towards the island's shoreline and into the center caldera.

In late June 2018, Sierra Negra, one of five volcanoes on Isabela and one of the most active in the Galapagos archipelago, began erupting for the first time since 2005. Lava flows made their way to the coastline, prompting the evacuation of about fifty nearby residents and restricting tourist access.

Main islands
The 18 main islands (each having a land area at least 1 km2) of the archipelago (with their English names) shown alphabetically:

 Baltra (South Seymour) Island – Baltra is a small flat island located near the centre of the Galápagos. It was created by geological uplift. The island is very arid, and vegetation consists of salt bushes, prickly pear cacti and palo santo trees. Until 1986, Baltra (Seymour) Airport was the only airport serving the Galápagos. Now, there are two airports which receive flights from the continent; the other is located on San Cristóbal Island. Private planes flying to Galápagos must fly to Baltra, as it is the only airport with facilities for planes overnight. On arriving in Baltra, all visitors are immediately transported by bus to one of two docks. The first dock is located in a small bay, where the boats cruising Galápagos await passengers. The second is a ferry dock, which connects Baltra to the island of Santa Cruz. During the 1940s, scientists decided to move 70 of Baltra's land iguanas to the neighboring North Seymour Island as part of an experiment. This move proved unexpectedly useful when the native iguanas became extinct on Baltra as a result of the island's military occupation in World War II. During the 1980s, iguanas from North Seymour were brought to the Charles Darwin Research Station as part of a breeding and repopulation project, and in the 1990s, land iguanas were reintroduced to Baltra. As of 1997, scientists counted 97 iguanas living on Baltra; 13 of which had hatched on the islands.
 Bartolomé (Bartholomew) Island – Bartolomé Island is a volcanic islet just off the east coast of Santiago Island in the Galápagos Islands group. it is one of the younger islands in the Galápagos archipelago. This island, and neighbouring Sulivan Bay on Santiago (James) island, are named after lifelong friend of Charles Darwin, Sir Bartholomew James Sulivan, who was a lieutenant aboard HMS Beagle. Today Sulivan Bay is often misspelled Sullivan Bay. This island is one of the few that are home to the Galápagos penguin which is the only wild penguin species to live on the equator. The green turtle is another animal that resides on the island.
 Darwin (Culpepper) Island – This island is named after Charles Darwin. Here fur seals, frigates, marine iguanas, swallow-tailed gulls, sea lions, whales, marine turtles, and red-footed and Nazca boobies can be seen. Darwin's Arch, a natural rock arch which would at one time have been part of this larger structure, is located less than a kilometre from the main Darwin Island, and it is a landmark well known to the island's few visitors. It collapsed in May 2021.

Española (Hood) Island – Its name was given in honor of Spain. It also is known as Hood, after Viscount Samuel Hood. Española is the oldest island at around 3.5 million years, and the southernmost in the group. Due to its remote location, Española has a large number of endemic species. It has its own species of lava lizard, mockingbird, and Galápagos tortoise. Española's marine iguanas exhibit a distinctive red coloration change between the breeding season. Española is the only place where the waved albatross nests. Some of the birds have attempted to breed on Genovesa (Tower) Island, but unsuccessfully. Española's steep cliffs serve as the perfect runways for these birds, which take off for their ocean feeding grounds near the mainland of Ecuador and Peru. Española has two visitor sites. Gardner Bay is a swimming and snorkelling site, and offers a great beach. Punta Suarez has migrant, resident, and endemic wildlife, including brightly colored marine iguanas, Española lava lizards, hood mockingbirds, swallow-tailed gulls, blue-footed boobies, Nazca boobies, red-billed tropicbirds, Galápagos hawks, three species of Darwin's finches, and the waved albatross.
 Fernandina (Narborough) Island – The name was given in honor of King Ferdinand II of Aragon, who sponsored the voyage of Columbus. This is the youngest and westernmost island. Punta Espinosa is a narrow stretch of land where hundreds of marine iguanas gather, largely on black lava rocks. The famous flightless cormorants inhabit this island, as do Galápagos penguins, pelicans, Galápagos sea lions and Galápagos fur seals. Different types of lava flows can be compared, and the mangrove forests can be observed.
 Floreana (Charles or Santa María) Island – It was named after Juan José Flores, the first President of Ecuador, during whose administration the government of Ecuador took possession of the archipelago. It is also called Santa Maria, after one of the caravels of Columbus. It is one of the islands with the most interesting human history, and one of the earliest to be inhabited. Flamingos and green sea turtles nest (December to May) on this island. The patapegada or Galápagos petrel, a sea bird which spends most of its life away from land, is found here. At Post Office Bay, where 19th-century whalers kept a wooden barrel that served as a post office, mail could be picked up and delivered to its destinations, mainly Europe and the United States, by ships on their way home. At the "Devil's Crown", an underwater volcanic cone and coral formations are found.
 Genovesa (Tower) Island – The name is derived from Genoa, Italy, the birthplace of Christopher Columbus. This island is formed by the remaining edge of a large caldera that is submerged. Its nickname of "the bird island" is clearly justified. At Darwin Bay, frigatebirds and swallow-tailed gulls, the only nocturnal species of gull in the world, can be seen. Red-footed boobies, noddy terns, lava gulls, tropic birds, doves, storm petrels and Darwin finches are also in sight. Prince Philip's Steps is a bird-watching plateau with Nazca and red-footed boobies. There is a large Palo Santo forest.
 Isabela (Albemarle) Island – This island was named in honor of Queen Isabella I of Castile. The island's seahorse shape is the product of the merging of six large volcanoes into a single land mass. On this island, Galápagos penguins, flightless cormorants, marine iguanas, pelicans and Sally Lightfoot crabs abound. At the skirts and calderas of the volcanoes of Isabela, land iguanas and Galápagos tortoises can be observed, as well as Darwin finches, Galápagos hawks, Galápagos doves and very interesting lowland vegetation. The third-largest human settlement of the archipelago, Puerto Villamil, is located at the southeastern tip of the island.

Galapagos hawks and sea lions inhabit this island, and it is home to the Marchena lava lizard, an endemic animal.
 North Seymour Island – Its name was given after an English nobleman, Lord Hugh Seymour. This island is home to a large population of blue-footed boobies and swallow-tailed gulls. It hosts one of the largest populations of frigate birds. It was formed from geological uplift.
Sea lions, Galápagos hawks, giant tortoises, marine iguanas, and dolphins can be seen here. Pinta Island was home to the last remaining Pinta tortoise, called Lonesome George. He was moved from Pinta Island to the Charles Darwin Research Station on Santa Cruz Island, where scientists attempted to breed from him. However, Lonesome George died in June 2012 without producing any offspring.
 Rábida (Jervis) Island – It bears the name of the convent of Rábida, where Columbus left his son during his voyage to the Americas. The high amount of iron contained in the lava at Rábida gives it a distinctive red colour. White-cheeked pintail ducks live in a saltwater lagoon close to the beach, where brown pelicans and boobies have built their nests. Until recently, flamingos were also found in the lagoon, but they have since moved on to other islands, likely due to a lack of food on Rábida. Nine species of finches have been reported in this island.
 San Cristóbal (Chatham) Island – It bears the name of the patron saint of seafarers, "St. Christopher". Its English name was given after William Pitt, 1st Earl of Chatham. This is the first island in the Galápagos Archipelago Charles Darwin visited during his voyage on the Beagle. This island hosts frigate birds, sea lions, giant tortoises, blue- and red-footed boobies, tropicbirds, marine iguanas, dolphins and swallow-tailed gulls. Its vegetation includes Calandrinia galapagos, Lecocarpus darwinii, and trees such as Lignum vitae. The largest freshwater lake in the archipelago, Laguna El Junco, is located in the highlands of San Cristóbal. The capital of the province of Galápagos is Puerto Baquerizo Moreno, which lies at the southern tip of the island, and is close to San Cristóbal Airport.

 Santa Cruz (Indefatigable) Island – Given the name of the Holy Cross in Spanish. It was originally named Norfolk Island by Cowley, but renamed after the British frigate HMS Indefatigable after her visit there in 1812. Santa Cruz hosts the largest human population in the archipelago, the town of Puerto Ayora. The Charles Darwin Research Station and the headquarters of the Galápagos National Park Service are located here. The GNPS and CDRS operate a tortoise breeding centre here, where young tortoises are hatched, reared, and prepared to be reintroduced to their natural habitat. The Highlands of Santa Cruz offer exuberant flora, and are famous for the lava tunnels. Large tortoise populations are found here. Black Turtle Cove is a site surrounded by mangroves, which sea turtles, rays and small sharks sometimes use as a mating area. Cerro Dragón, known for its flamingo lagoon, is also located here, and along the trail one may see land iguanas foraging.
Santa Fe hosts a forest of Opuntia cactus, which are the largest of the archipelago, and Palo Santo. Weathered cliffs provide a haven for swallow-tailed gulls, red-billed tropic birds and shearwater petrels. Santa Fe species of land iguanas are often seen, as well as lava lizards.
Santiago (San Salvador, James) Island – Its name is equivalent to Saint James in English; it is also known as San Salvador, after the first island discovered by Columbus in the Caribbean Sea. Marine iguanas, sea lions, fur seals, land and sea turtles, flamingos, dolphins and sharks are found here. Pigs and goats, which were introduced by humans to the islands and have caused great harm to the endemic species, have been eradicated (pigs by 2002; goats by the end of 2006). Darwin finches and Galápagos hawks are usually seen, as well as a colony of fur seals. At Sulivan Bay, a recent (around 100 years ago) pahoehoe lava flow can be observed.
 Wolf (Wenman) Island – This island was named after the German geologist Theodor Wolf. Here, fur seals, frigatebirds, Nazca and red-footed boobies, marine iguanas, sharks, whales, dolphins and swallow-tailed gulls can be seen. The most famous resident is the vampire finch, which feeds partly on blood pecked from other birds, and is only found on this island.

Minor islands
 Daphne Major – A small island directly north of Santa Cruz and directly west of Baltra, this very inaccessible island appears, though unnamed, on Ambrose Cowley's 1684 chart. It is important as the location of multidecade finch population studies by Peter and Rosemary Grant.
 South Plaza Island (Plaza Sur) – It is named in honor of a former president of Ecuador, General Leónidas Plaza. The flora of South Plaza includes Opuntia cactus and Sesuvium plants, which form a reddish carpet on top of the lava formations. Iguanas (land, marine and some hybrids of both species) are abundant, and large numbers of birds can be observed from the cliffs at the southern part of the island, including tropic birds and swallow-tailed gulls.
 Nameless Island – A small islet used mostly for scuba diving.
Herman Melville devotes the third and fourth sketches of The Encantadas to describing this islet (which he calls "Rock Rodondo") and the view from it.

Climate

Although the islands are located on the equator, the Humboldt Current brings cold water to them, causing frequent drizzles during most of the year. The weather is periodically influenced by the El Niño events, which occur about every 3 to 7 years and are characterized by warm sea surface temperatures, a rise in sea level, greater wave action, and a depletion of nutrients in the water.

Weather changes as altitude increases in the large islands. Temperature decreases gradually with altitude, while precipitation increases due to the condensation of moisture in clouds on the slopes. There is a large range in precipitation from one place to another, not only with altitude, but also depending on the location of the islands, and also with the seasons.

The archipelago is mainly characterized by a mixture of a tropical savanna climate and a semi-arid climate. It also transits into a tropical rainforest climate in the northwest.

The following table corresponding to the wet 1969 shows the variation of precipitation in different places of Santa Cruz Island:

The precipitation also depends on the geographical location. This is because Baltra is located behind Santa Cruz with respect to the prevailing southerly winds, so most of the moisture gets precipitated in the Santa Cruz highlands.

There are significant changes in precipitation from one year to another, too.

On the larger islands, the pattern of generally wet highlands and drier lowlands affects the flora. The vegetation in the highlands tends to be green and lush, with tropical woodland in places. The lowland areas tend to have arid and semi-arid vegetation, with many thorny shrubs and cacti, and almost bare volcanic rock elsewhere.

Ecology

Terrestrial

Most of the Galápagos is covered in semi-desert vegetation, including shrublands, grasslands, and dry forest. A few of the islands have high-elevation areas with cooler temperatures and higher rainfall, which are home to humid-climate forests and shrublands, and montane grasslands (pampas) at the highest elevations. There are about 500 species of native vascular plants on the islands, including 90 species of ferns. About 180 vascular plant species are endemic.

The islands are well known for their distinctive endemic species, including giant tortoises, finches, flightless cormorants, Galápagos lava lizards and marine iguanas, which evolved to adapt to islands' environments.

History

Pre-Columbian era
Whether the Incas ever made it to the islands is disputed. Oceanic Pacific islands in the same general area as Galápagos (including Clipperton Island, Cocos Island, Desventuradas Islands, Juan Fernández Islands and the Revillagigedo Islands) were all uninhabited when discovered by Europeans, with nothing to indicate any prehistoric human activity. The easternmost oceanic island in the South Pacific that was discovered with a human population was Easter Island. Through DNA studies and linguistics, its population, the Rapa Nui people, are known to be Polynesian rather than Indigenous American.

In 1572, Spanish chronicler Pedro Sarmiento de Gamboa claimed that Topa Inca Yupanqui, the second Sapa Inca of the Inca Empire had visited the archipelago, but there is little evidence for this, and many experts consider it a far-fetched legend, especially since the Incas were not seafaring people. According to a 1952 archaeological survey by Thor Heyerdahl and Arne Skjølsvold, potsherds and other artifacts from several sites on the islands suggest visitation by South American peoples in pre-Columbian era. The group located an Inca flute and shards from more than 130 pieces of ceramics, which were later identified as pre-Incan. However, no remains of graves, ceremonial vessels or constructions have ever been found, suggesting no permanent settlement occurred before the Spanish arrived in the 16th century. A 2016 reanalysis of Heyerdahl and Skjølsvold's archaeological sites rejected their conclusions. They found that at all locations, artifacts of Indian and European origin were interspersed without the distinct spatial or stratigraphic arrangement that would be expected from independent sequential deposition (indeed, Heyerdahl and Skjølsvold had reported the intermixing of European and American artifacts in their original report). Radiocarbon dates from the sites placed them in the historical (post-Spanish-arrival) era, and preliminary paleoenvironmental analysis showed no disturbance older than 500 years before present, suggesting the islands were probably not visited prior to their Spanish discovery in 1535. The authors suggested that native artifacts found by Heyerdahl and Skjølsvold had probably been brought as mementos or souvenirs at the time of Spanish occupation.
 A 2008 report by archeologists from the Australian National University stated that certain Asia-Pacific taxa may have been growing in the Galápagos prior to 1535, which, "would constitute a strong line of evidence for accidental or deliberate landfall in the Galápagos by a Polynesian vessel." Their report also claimed there is a growing body of evidence to suggest that Pacific islands beyond Easter Island "did not play a ‘stepping stone’ role in the interaction between Amerindians or Polynesians in prehistory."  Whatever their identity, the first visitors to the islands were likely unimpressed by the lack of fresh water on the islands.

European voyages
European discovery of the Galápagos Islands occurred when Spaniard Fray Tomás de Berlanga, the fourth Bishop of Panama, sailed to Peru to settle a dispute between Francisco Pizarro and his lieutenants. Berlanga's vessel drifted off course when the winds diminished, and his party reached the islands by mere chance on 10 March 1535. They were uninhabited, and continued to remain unclaimed once the men left.

The Galápagos Islands first appeared on the maps of Gerardus Mercator and Abraham Ortelius, in about 1570. The islands were named "Insulae de los Galopegos" (Islands of the Tortoises) in reference to the giant tortoises found there.

The first English captain to visit the Galápagos Islands was Richard Hawkins, in 1593. Until the early 19th century, the archipelago was often used as a hideout by mostly English pirates who attacked a Spanish treasure fleet carrying gold and silver from South America to Spain.

In 1793, James Colnett described the flora and fauna of Galápagos, and suggested the islands could be used as base for the whalers operating in the Pacific Ocean. He drew the first accurate navigation charts of the islands. Whalers and maritime fur traders killed and captured thousands of the Galápagos tortoises to extract their fat. The tortoises could be kept on board ship as a means of providing of fresh protein, as these animals could survive for several months on board without any food or water. The hunting of the tortoises was responsible for greatly diminishing, and in some cases eliminating, certain species. Along with whalers came the fur-seal hunters, who brought the population of this animal close to extinction.

The first known permanent human resident on Galápagos was Patrick Watkins, an Irish sailor who was marooned on the Island Floreana from 1807 to 1809. According to later accounts, Watkins managed to survive by hunting, growing vegetables and trading with visiting whalers, before finally stealing an open boat and navigating to Guayaquil.

In 1818 the Nantucket whaleship Globe, under Captain George Washington Gardner, discovered a "mother lode" of sperm whales some thousand miles west of the South American coast approximately at the equator. He returned to Nantucket in 1820 with more than 2,000 barrels of sperm whale oil and the news of his discovery. This led to an influx of whaleships to exploit the new whaling ground and the Galápagos Islands became a frequent stop for the whalers both before and after visiting what came to be known as the Offshore Grounds. This led to the establishment in the Galápagos Islands of a kind of unofficial "post office" where whaleships stopped to pick up and drop off letters as well as for provisioning and repairing.

In October 1820, the whaleship Essex, out of Nantucket, stopped at the Galápagos for these purposes on its way to the Offshore Grounds. On what was then known as Charles Island, while most of the crew were hunting tortoises one crewmember, English boatsteerer Thomas Chappel, for reasons still unclear, lit a fire which quickly burned out of control. Some of the tortoise hunters had a narrow escape and had to run a gauntlet of fire to get back to the ship. Soon almost the entire island was in flames. Crewmembers reported that after a day of sailing away they could still see the flames against the horizon. One crewmember who returned to the Galápagos several years afterward described the entire island as still a blackened wasteland.

Ecuadorian Galápagos

Scientific expeditions and first settlers
Ecuador annexed the Galápagos Islands on 12 February 1832, naming them the Archipelago of Ecuador. This new name added to several names that had been, and are still, used to refer to the archipelago. The first governor of Galápagos, General José de Villamil, brought a group of convicts to populate the island of Floreana, and in October 1832, some artisans and farmers joined them.

The voyage of the Beagle brought the survey ship HMS Beagle, under captain Robert FitzRoy, to the Galápagos on 15 September 1835 to survey approaches to harbours. The captain and others on board, including his companion, the young naturalist Charles Darwin, made observations on the geology and biology on Chatham, Charles, Albemarle and James islands before they left on 20 October to continue on their round-the-world expedition. Primarily a geologist at the time, Darwin was impressed by the quantity of volcanic craters they saw, later referring to the archipelago as "that land of craters". His study of several volcanic formations over the five weeks he stayed in the islands led to several important geological discoveries, including the first, correct explanation for how volcanic tuff is formed. Darwin noticed the mockingbirds differed between islands, though he thought the birds now known as Darwin's finches were unrelated to each other, and did not bother labelling them by island. Nicholas Lawson, acting Governor of Galápagos for the Republic of  Equator, met them on Charles Island, and as they walked to the prison colony, Lawson told Darwin the tortoises differed from island to island. Towards the end of the voyage, Darwin speculated that the distribution of the mockingbirds and the tortoises might "undermine the stability of Species". When specimens of birds were analyzed on his return to England, it was found that many apparently different kinds of birds were species of finches, which were unique to islands. These facts were crucial in Darwin's development of his theory of natural selection explaining evolution, which was presented in On the Origin of Species.

In April 1888 , a Navy-crewed research vessel assigned to the United States Fish Commission, briefly touched eight islands in the Galapagos group for specimens; this included Wreck Bay on Chatham Island (now San Cristóbal Island) on 4 April and Charles Island (now Floreana Island) on 8 April.

José Valdizán and Manuel Julián Cobos tried a new colonization, beginning the exploitation of a type of lichen found in the islands (Roccella portentosa) used as a coloring agent. After the assassination of Valdizán by some of his workers, Cobos brought from the continent to San Cristóbal Island a group of more than a hundred workers, and tried his luck at planting sugar cane. He ruled his plantation with an iron hand, which led to his assassination in 1904. In 1897, Antonio Gil began another plantation on Isabela Island.

Over the course of a whole year, from September 1904, an expedition of the Academy of Sciences of California, led by Rollo Beck, stayed in the Galápagos collecting scientific material on geology, entomology, ornithology, botany, zoology, and herpetology. Another expedition from that Academy was done in 1932 (Templeton Crocker Expedition) to collect insects, fish, shells, fossils, birds, and plants.

From geopolitical hotspot to national park
For a long time during the early 1900s and at least through 1929, a cash-strapped Ecuador had reached out for potential buyers of the islands to alleviate financial troubles at home. The US had repeatedly expressed its interest in buying the islands for military use as they were positioned strategically guarding the Panama Canal. Besides the United States, Japan, Germany and Chile also expressed interest in establishing bases in the islands at the turn of the century. Chile had previously acquired the Straits of Magellan and Easter Island for strategic reasons and lieutenant Gregorio Santa Cruz argued in 1903 that possessing an island in equatorial waters, like the Galápagos, would be of great benefit since the geopolitical situation of Chile was expected to drastically change when the Panama Canal opened. Another benefit would be to widen the security radius of Chile. Chile was alarmed by the United States plans to establish a Guantanamo-like base in the Galápagos Islands since it would mean that Chile's nitrate-rich northern provinces would be within the range of United States Navy. Ecuador's staunch resistance to a US purchase or bases in the islands can be credited to Chilean diplomacy, which in turn was informally backed on this issue by Great Britain and Germany.

In the 1920s and 1930s, a small wave of European settlers arrived in the islands. There occurred a series of unsolved disappearances on the island of Floreana in the 1930s among the largely European expatriate residents at the time. The Galápagos Affair: Satan Came to Eden is a 2013 feature-length documentary film about the same. Ecuadorian laws provided all colonists with the possibility of receiving twenty hectares each of free land, the right to maintain their citizenship, freedom from taxation for the first ten years in Galápagos, and the right to hunt and fish freely on all uninhabited islands where they might settle. The first European colonists to arrive were Norwegians who settled briefly on Floreana, before moving on to San Cristobal and Santa Cruz. A few years later, other colonists from Europe, America and Ecuador started arriving on the islands, seeking a simpler life. Descendants of the Norwegian Kastdalen family and the German Angermeyer still live on the islands.

During World War II, Ecuador authorized the United States to establish a naval base in Baltra Island, and radar stations in other strategic locations. Baltra was established as a United States Army Air Force base. Baltra was given the name of "Beta Base" along with "Alpha Base" in Nicaragua and "Gamma Base" in Salinas (continental Ecuador). The Crews stationed at Baltra and the aforementioned locations established a geographic triangle of protection in charge of patrolling the Pacific for enemy submarines, and also provided protection for the Panama Canal. After the war, the facilities were given to the government of Ecuador. Today, the island continues as an official Ecuadorian military base. The foundations and other remains of the US base can still be seen as one crosses the island.
In 1946, a penal colony was established on Isabela Island, but it was suspended in 1959.

The Galápagos became a national park in 1959, and tourism started in the 1960s, imposing several restrictions upon the human population already living on the island. However, opportunities in the tourism, fishing, and farming industries attracted a mass of poor fishermen and farmers from mainland Ecuador. In the 1990s and 2000s, violent confrontations between parts of the local population and the Galápagos National Park Service occurred, including capturing and killing giant tortoises and holding staff of the Galápagos National Park Service hostage to obtain higher annual sea cucumber quotas.

Politics

The islands are administered by a provincial government. It was made a province by presidential decree by President Guillermo Rodríguez Lara on 18 February 1973. The province is divided into cantons, each covering certain islands. The capital is Puerto Baquerizo Moreno.

Demographics

The largest ethnic group is composed of Ecuadorian Mestizos, the mixed descendants of Spanish colonists and indigenous Native Americans, who arrived mainly in the last century from the continental part of Ecuador. Some descendants of the early European and American colonists on the islands also still remain on the islands.

In 1959, approximately 1,000 to 2,000 people called the islands their home. In 1972 a census in the archipelago recorded a population of 3,488. By the 1980s, this number had risen to more than 15,000 people, and in 2010 there were 25,124 people in the Galápagos. 2021 projected population was 40,685.

Five of the islands are inhabited: Baltra, Floreana, Isabela, San Cristóbal, and Santa Cruz.

Travel

Options for air travel to the Galápagos are limited to two islands: San Cristobal (San Cristóbal Airport) and Baltra (Seymour Airport). Private aircraft must use Baltra as it is the airport equipped with overnight plane accommodations. Seymour Airport on Baltra was recently renovated (2012–2013) to accommodate larger planes.

Until 1969 the only way to visit was on a private or chartered vessel. There was no regular air service until Forrest Nelson's Hotel Galápagos began the first organized tours in April 1969. Soon other travel companies brought in tour ships and yachts, and local fishermen began converting their wooden boats for rudimentary cruising with guests. These vessels were the main source of overnight accommodations in the Galápagos. Today there are about 85 yachts and ships equipped for overnight guests. In 2006 the Baltra military governed island, was opened up to limited overnight camping. Baltra also requires permits by the military government for overnight stays on the beach. Other inhabited islands also allow camping on the beaches designated as "recreational" use to the locals. All of these camping permits are limited to number of people and nights, with most nights not to exceed three.

Land based hotels are opening on the inhabited islands of San Cristobal, Santa Cruz, Floreana and Isabela. By 2012, more than half the visitors to Galápagos made their tours using day boats and these small hotels. Restaurants, easy access and economy make this an attractive travel option.

There are only 116 visitor sites in the Galápagos: 54 land sites and 62 scuba-diving or snorkeling sites. Small groups are allowed to visit in 2- to 4-hour shifts only, to limit impact on the area. All groups are accompanied by licensed guides.

Environmental protection policy

 

Though the first protective legislation for the Galápagos was enacted in 1930 and supplemented in 1936, it was not until the late 1950s that positive action was taken to control what was happening to the native flora and fauna. In 1955, the International Union for the Conservation of Nature organized a fact-finding mission to the Galápagos. Two years later, in 1957, UNESCO, in cooperation with the government of Ecuador, sent another expedition to study the conservation situation and choose a site for a research station.

In 1959, the centenary year of Charles Darwin's publication of The Origin of Species, the Ecuadorian government declared 97.5% of the archipelago's land area a national park, excepting areas already colonised. The Charles Darwin Foundation (CDF) was founded the same year. The core responsibility of CDF, an international nongovernmental organization (NGO) constituted in Belgium, is to conduct research and provide the research findings to the government for effective management of Galápagos. CDF's research efforts began with the establishment of the Charles Darwin Research Station on Santa Cruz Island in 1964. During the early years, conservation programs, such as eradication of introduced species and protection of native species, were carried out by research station personnel. Now much of that work is accomplished by the Galápagos National Park Service using the research findings and methodologies developed by CDF.

In 1986, the 70,000 square kilometers (27,000 sq mi) of ocean surrounding the islands was declared a marine reserve, second in size only to Australia's Great Barrier Reef. In 1990, the archipelago became a whale sanctuary. UNESCO recognized the islands in 1978 as a World Heritage Site and in 1985, as a biosphere reserve. This was later extended in December 2001 to include the marine reserve.
In July 2010, the World Heritage Committee agreed to remove the Galápagos Islands from its list of precious sites endangered by environmental threats or overuse.

Noteworthy species include:
 Galápagos dove, Zenaida galapagoensis, two subspecies
 Galápagos flycatcher, Myiarchus magnirostris
 Galápagos land iguanas, Conolophus spp.
 Marine iguana, Amblyrhynchus cristatus, the only iguana feeding in the sea
 Galápagos tortoise (Galápagos giant tortoise), Chelonoidis nigra, known as galápago in Spanish, it gave the name to the islands
 Galápagos green turtle, Chelonia mydas agassisi, a subspecies of the green turtle
 Galápagos racer, Pseudalsophis biserialis,  an endemic species of snake with two subspecies
 Sea cucumbers, the cause of environmental battles with fishermen over quotas of this expensive Asian delicacy
 Flightless cormorant, Phalacrocorax harrisi
 Great frigatebird and magnificent frigatebird
 Blue-footed booby, Sula nebouxii, popular among visitors for their large blue feet which they show off in courtship
 Galápagos penguin, Spheniscus mendiculus, the only living tropical penguin
 Waved albatross, Phoebastria irrorata, the only living tropical albatross
 Galápagos hawk, Buteo galapagoensis, the islands' main scavenger (at the top of the food chain) and "environmental police"
 Four endemic species of Galápagos mockingbirds, the first species Darwin noticed to vary from island to island
 Thirteen endemic species of tanagers, popularly called Darwin's finches. Among them is the sharp-beaked ground finch Geospiza difficilis septentrionalis which is sometimes called the "vampire finch" for its blood-sucking habits, and the tool-using woodpecker finch, Camarhynchus pallidus
 Galápagos sea lions, Zalophus wollebaeki, closely related to the California sea lion, but smaller
 Two endemic genera of cacti, each with a single species: Jasminocereus thouarsii, the candelabra cactus, and Brachycereus nesioticus, the lava cactus

Environmental threats

Introduced plants and animals, such as feral goats, cats, and cattle, brought accidentally or willingly to the islands by humans, represent the main threat to Galápagos. Quick to reproduce and with no natural predators, these alien species decimated the habitats of native species. The native animals, lacking natural predators on the islands, are defenseless to introduced predators.

There are over 700 introduced plant species today. There are only 500 native and endemic species. This difference is creating a major problem for the islands and the natural species that inhabit them. These plants have invaded large areas and eliminated endemic species in the humid zones of San Cristobal, Floreana, Isabela and Santa Cruz. Some of the most harmful introduced plants are the guayaba or guava (Psidium guajava), avocado (Persea americana), cascarilla (Cinchona pubescens), balsa (Ochroma pyramidale), hill raspberry (Rubus niveus), various citrus (orange, grapefruit, lemon), floripondio, higuerilla (Ricinus communis) trees and the elephant grass, Pennisetum purpureum.

Many species were introduced to the Galápagos by pirates. Thor Heyerdahl quoted documents that mention the Viceroy of Peru, knowing that British pirates ate the goats that they themselves had released in the islands, ordered dogs to be freed there to eliminate the goats. Also, when colonization of Floreana by José de Villamil failed, he ordered the goats, donkeys, cattle and other animals from the farms in Floreana be transferred to other islands for the purpose of later colonization.

Non-native goats, pigs, dogs, rats, cats, mice, sheep, horses, donkeys, cows, poultry, ants, cockroaches, and some parasites inhabit the islands today. Dogs and cats attack the tame birds and destroy the nests of birds, land tortoises, and marine turtles. They sometimes kill small Galápagos tortoises and iguanas. Pigs are even more harmful, covering larger areas and destroying the nests of tortoises, turtles and iguanas, as well as eating the animals' native food. Pigs also knock down vegetation in their search for roots and insects. This problem abounds in Cerro Azul volcano and Isabela, and in Santiago, pigs may be the cause of the disappearance of the land iguanas that were so abundant when Darwin visited. The black rat (Rattus rattus) attacks small Galápagos tortoises when they leave the nest, so in Pinzón they stopped the reproduction for a period of more than 50 years; only adults were found on that island. Also, where the black rat is found, the endemic rat has disappeared. Cattle and donkeys eat all the available vegetation and compete with native species for scarce water. In 1959, fishermen introduced one male and two female goats to Pinta island; by 1973, the National Park service estimated the population of goats to be over 30,000 individuals. Goats were also introduced to Marchena in 1967 and to Rabida in 1971. A goat eradication program, however, cleared the goats from Pinta and Santiago and most of the goat population from Isabela, and, by 2006, all feral pigs, donkeys and non-sterile goats had been eliminated from Santiago and Isabela, the largest islands with the worst problems due to non-native mammals.

Six species of small non-native vertebrates have established self-sufficient populations in Galápagos and may become invasive: Fowler's snouted tree frog Scinax quinquefasciatus, common house gecko Hemidactylus frenatus, mourning gecko Lepidodactylus lugubris, dwarf gecko Gonatodes caudiscutatus, Peters' leaf-toed gecko Phyllodactylus reissii, and smooth-billed ani Crotophaga ani. Domestic fowl Gallus gallus holds feral populations, which may have self-sufficient populations, but evidence is unclear.

The fast-growing poultry industry on the inhabited islands has been cause for concern from local conservationists, who fear domestic birds could introduce disease into the endemic wild bird populations.

The Galápagos marine sanctuary is under threat from a host of illegal fishing activities, in addition to other problems of development. The most pressing threat to the Marine Reserve comes from local, mainland and foreign fishing targeting marine life illegally within the Reserve, such as sharks (hammerheads and other species) for their fins, and the harvest of sea cucumbers out of season. Development threatens both land and sea species. The growth of both the tourism industry and local populations fuelled by high birth rates and illegal immigration threaten the wildlife of the Archipelago. The grounding of the oil tanker Jessica in 2001 and the subsequent oil spill brought this threat to world attention.

In 2007, UNESCO put the Galápagos Islands on their List of World Heritage in Danger because of threats posed by invasive species, unbridled tourism and overfishing.
On 29 July 2010, the World Heritage Committee decided to remove the Galápagos Islands from the list because the Committee found significant progress had been made by Ecuador in addressing these problems.

On 28 January 2008, Galápagos National Park official Victor Carrion announced 53 sea lions (13 pups, 25 youngsters, 9 males and 6 females) were killed at the Galápagos Islands nature reserve on Pinta, with their heads caved in. In 2001, poachers killed 35 male sea lions.

The Galápagos Islands were short-listed as a candidate to be one of the New7Wonders of Nature by the New7Wonders of Nature Foundation. As of February 2009, the archipelago was ranked first in Group B, the category for islands.

The islands' biodiversity is under threat from several sources. The human population is growing at a rate of 8% per year (1995). Introduced species have caused damage, and in 1996 a US$5 million, five-year eradication plan commenced in an attempt to rid the islands of introduced species such as goats, rats, deer, and donkeys. Except for the rats, the project was essentially completed in 2006. Rats have only been eliminated from the smaller Galápagos Islands of Rábida and Pinzón.

El Niño has adversely affected the marine ecosystem. In January 2001, an oil slick from a stranded tanker threatened the islands, but winds and shifting ocean currents helped disperse the oil before much damage was done. The devastating El Niño of 1982–83 saw almost six times as much rain as normal in the Galapagos and created a wildlife catastrophe. The 1997–98 El Niño adversely affected wildlife in the waters surrounding the islands, as the waters were  warmer than normal. Corals and barnacles suffered, hammerhead sharks were driven away, and most of the island's seabirds failed to breed in 1997–98. The mortality rate of marine iguanas rose as the green algae they feed on was replaced by inedible red algae. During the 1982–83 El Niño, 70% of the marine iguanas starved to death because of this.

See also

List of birds of the Galápagos Islands
List of animals in the Galápagos Islands
 Galápagos National Park
 Galápagos hotspot
 Galápagos Islands xeric scrub
 Galápagos Province
 Darwin's Arch
 Johanna Angermeyer, author of various books featuring the Galápagos Islands

References

Further reading
 Black, Juan (1973). Galápagos, Archipiélago del Ecuador. (Quito, Ecuador). Comprehensive monograph by a former officer of Galápagos National Park, financed by the World Wildlife Fund and the Charles Darwin Foundation for the Galápagos Islands
 Grant, K. Thalia and Estes, Gregory B. (2009). Darwin in Galapagos: Footsteps to a New World. Princeton University Press, Princeton. .
 Heyerdahl, Thor; & Skjolsvold, Arne (1956). Archaeological Evidence of Pre-Spanish Visits to the Galápagos Islands, Memoirs 12, Society for American Archaeology.
 Müller, Bodo; & Stolt, Matthias (2003). Galápagos Die verwunschenen Inseln. (BLV). .
 Quammen, David (1996). The Song of the Dodo. Touchstone, New York.
 Romero, Simon (4 October 2009). "To Protect Galápagos, Ecuador Limits a Two-Legged Species". The New York Times.
 Perry, Roger (1972). The Galapagos Islands. (Dodd, Mead & Company). Short history illustrated with photographs and a map by a former director of Charles Darwin Research Station.
 Wittmer, Margret (2013). Floreana: A Woman's Pilgrimage to the Galápagos. (Moyer Bell Limited). Memoir written by the matriarch of the first family to successfully inhabit Floreana, after settling there in 1932. 2013 paperback edition  (originally published by the Travel Book Club in 1961)

External links

 
 

 Galápagos geology, with general information on the Galápagos Islands

 
Islands
Biosphere reserves of Ecuador
Surfing locations in Ecuador
Ecoregions of Ecuador
Pacific islands of Ecuador
Seabird colonies
States and territories established in 1973
World Heritage Sites in Ecuador
Tourist attractions in Galápagos Province
Articles containing video clips
Tropical Eastern Pacific